North Allegheny School District is a large, suburban public school district located in McCandless, Pennsylvania, about  north of Pittsburgh.

Notable alumni
Warren Woodrow "Woody" Hoburg(NASA astronaut) -current NASA Astronaut selected for the Artemis mission and pilot of the crew dragon 6 mission to the ISS
Melissa Hart (1980) – former United States Representative
Frank Nicotero (1987) – comedian
Tim Manoa – former professional American football player, Cleveland Browns, Indianapolis Colts

References

External links
 North Allegheny School District

Education in Pittsburgh area
School districts in Allegheny County, Pennsylvania